Mishkan Chicago is a progressive Jewish community in Chicago, Illinois.  It was founded in 2011 by Rabbi Lizzi Heydemann and was loosely modeled after IKAR in Los Angeles, where Heydemann served as a rabbinic intern, and is a member of the Jewish Emergent Network.

It describes its mission as "to engage, educate, empower, connect and inspire people through dynamic experiences of Jewish prayer, learning, social activism and community building."  It also engages in support of refugee resettlement in the Chicago area.

Unlike a traditional synagogue, Mishkan Chicago does not have a fixed worship space, and uses multiple locations throughout the Chicago area.

The community serves over 5,000 people each year, including over 1,400 for annual High Holiday services.

During the COVID-19 pandemic, Mishkan transitioned its services to a wholly-online format using Zoom and held High Holiday services using a mix of asynchronously-recorded video, live video, and socially-distanced events.

References

Synagogues in Chicago
2011 establishments in Illinois